Acanthogonatus quilocura is a mygalomorph spider of Chile, its name referring to the seemingly unending number of species within this genus (“locura” meaning madness in Spanish). Males are similar to those of A. tacuariensis (from Uruguay), from which are distinguished by a curved metatarsus I; female spermathecae are characteristic in having a strongly bent duct arising from the base of a blunt basal dome.

Description
Female: total length ; cephalothorax length , width ; cephalic region length , width ; fovea width ; medial ocular quadrangle (OQ) length , width ; labium length , width ; sternum length , width . Its cephalic region is convex, with its fovea slightly procurved, with a small posterior notch. Its labium possesses 3 cuspules. A well-developed serrula is present. Its sternal sigilla is small and oval, connected to the sternal margin by a depression; the sternum is slightly rebordered. Chelicerae: the rastellum is formed by thickened, attenuate setae. Spermathecae have their lateral duct strongly bent. Color as in male.
Male: total length ; cephalothorax length , width , cephalic region length , width ; OQ length , width ; labium length , width ; sternum length , width . Its labium possesses 1 cuspule. Its serrula is well developed. Its sternal sigilla is elongate, with an outer side depressed, forming a connection with the sternal margin, which is rebordered. Chelicerae: rastellum is absent. Cheliceral tumescence small and pallid, ventrally protruding. Leg I and its metatarsus are curved downwards. The entire spider is a golden brown colour, while its abdomen is yellowish golden-brown with darker brown spots.

Distribution
This species appears to be restricted to Region Metropolitana. It has been collected from burrows similar to A. huaquen.

References

External links

 ADW entry

Pycnothelidae
Spiders of South America
Spiders described in 1995
Endemic fauna of Chile